Franz the Bear is a statue of a bear on a bench by Michele vandenHeuvel, installed in Park City, Utah, United States.

History
Someone placed a face mask on the statue during the COVID-19 pandemic. The bear was also featured in signs encouraging people to wear masks. The work was vandalized in January 2021.

See also

 Loosey the Moose

References

External links
 Franz the Bear at CODAworx

Buildings and structures in Park City, Utah
Outdoor sculptures in Utah
Sculptures of bears
Statues in Utah
Vandalized works of art in Utah